The Church of the Three Bishops (Georgian: სამი მღვდელმთავრის სახელობის ეკლესია) St. Basil the Great, St. Gregory the Theologian and St. John Chrysostom is located in the village of Bobokvati. It houses the relics of 28 saints. The day of the temple is celebrated on the 12th of February.

See also 
List of tallest churches
List of large Orthodox cathedrals

References 

Georgian Orthodox churches in Georgia (country)
Churches completed in 2009
21st-century Eastern Orthodox church buildings
Buildings and structures in Adjara